Pedro I was a ship of the line of the Imperial Brazilian Navy. It was a third-rate, three-masted, two-decked 74-gunned sailing ship. The ship was built by builder Antônio da Silva in the Bahia Navy Arsenal in Salvador for the Portuguese navy in Colonial Brazil in 1763. First named Santo António e São José, it took part in several naval actions in the decades after its construction such as the bombardment of Algiers in 1784.

It was part of the fleet that transferred the Portuguese royal family and its court to Brazil during the French invasion of Portugal. Later, during the Brazilian War of Independence, it was seized by the Brazilians and incorporated into the newly formed Imperial Brazilian Navy to fight the Portuguese forces stationed in Brazil, being the navy's first flagship, whose commander was admiral Thomas Cochrane, the first admiral of Brazil, and taking part in the battle of 4 May off Salvador.

During the Cisplatine War the ship was tasked with transporting emperor Pedro I to southern Brazil; however, due to the death of Maria Leopoldina of Austria, the emperor's wife, it returned to Rio de Janeiro and did not take part in any further naval actions. Pedro I served its final years as a prison ship, being scrapped in 1833 after about 70 years in service.

Characteristics
The ship's keel measured 60m, 14m of beam, 12m of depth and 6.37m of draft. It was rigged as galera, that is, it hoisted three robust masts. When first built, It had three spacious battery packs, with 70 hatches armed with carronades and culverins of heavy and medium caliber. Its first battery deck consisted of twenty six 24-pounder guns; the second battery deck consisted of twenty six 12-pounder guns; the aftercastle was armed with two 12-pounder, eight 9-pounder and four 1-pounder guns. It also had an additional four 1-pounder guns. Its crew, made up of sailors and troops, must have numbered between 600 and 700 men. It had a dog as its figurehead, for which its sailors often referred to the ship as "Cão" (dog).

Construction
The ship was built at the Bahia Navy Arsenal by builder Antônio da Silva. The keel was laid on 1 October 1760 and it was named, according to the tradition of the time, to the double blessing of Anthony of Padua and Saint Joseph. The construction lasted for twenty-eight months; its launch took place on 29 January 1763, during the government of Marcos José de Noronha e Brito, the 6th Count of Arcos and 7th Viceroy of Brazil.

Service

In the Royal Portuguese navy

In southern Brazil

Upon its completion, Santo António e São José departed for Santa Catarina in southern Brazil after completing a trip to Lisbon. The Portuguese expected Spanish attacks in the region and also planned to reconquer the part of the territory of present-day Brazilian state of Rio Grande do Sul which had been occupied by Spain as a result of the Fantastic War. This prompted the formation of a naval division to be stationed in Santa Catarina, with Santo António e São José as its flagship, in order to provide support for the troops on land and patrol the coast. The commander of such division was Irish officer Robert MacDuall (also spelled Duval or Douall). The commander of Santo António e São José was captain of sea and war José da Silva Pimentel.

The instructions sent on 9 August 1774 by the Marquis of Pombal to the Viceroy of Brazil, Luís de Almeida Portugal, the 2nd Marquis of Lavradio, read:

By 1 February 1775, the squadron had already reached Santa Catarina, with Santo António e São José serving as its flagship. The following year, on 6 February 1776, at 15:00, Santo António e São José sailed from Santa Catarina towards Rio Grande do Sul accompanied by nine vessels: two frigates, two corvettes, three smacks, a brig and a sloop. Part of the Santa Catarina Regiment embarked on these ships, this regiment was known as Barriga Verde, "Green Belly". The squadron reached its destination on February 14, anchoring away from the coast. The next day chief MacDuall went ashore in order to meet with the Army Commander in Operations.

Shortly after, heavy winds hit the squadron from the southeast, which caused a lot of problems to it, as it was anchored outside the port, which was occupied by both naval and land Spanish forces. In the morning of February 19, the squadron, headed by Santo António, entered the port and attacked the enemy naval forces stationed there the next day. In addition to some wounded, eight soldiers died in the combat. On April 1 of that same year, a new attack was carried out on the port's fortifications and naval forces. This attack ended in a Luso-Brazilian victory, as it gave them the complete possession of Rio Grande do Sul.

Spanish attack on Santa Catarina island
By the end of 1776, a large Spanish fleet consisting of 20 warships and 97 transport ships carrying 12 thousand soldiers divided into four brigades, was sailing in the southern Brazilian coast. The fleet was commanded by admiral Antonio Barceló and the troops were in command of Pedro Antonio de Cevallos, viceroy of the Viceroyalty of the Río de la Plata. Their goal was to take control of Portuguese possessions in the region. The fleet was armed with a total of 674 cannons, carrying 5,148 sailors and 1,308 marines on board.

On 6 February 1777 this fleet seized three Portuguese ships off the coast of Brazil. The Spaniards found official reports in these ships detailing the rather precarious state of the Portuguese defenses in the Santa Catarina Island and decided to head there to attack and take control of it. It was only on February 17 that the Portuguese noticed the approach of the Spaniards. On 20 February chief MacDuall gathered on board the Santo António a council of commanders. One of them, a Portuguese admiral, was willing to fight the Spanish forces, but the instructions that had been sent to him by the 2nd Marquis of Lavradio determined not to risk their fleet. Out of the commanders, captain of sea and war José de Melo Brayner was the only one that voted for the fight. The Portuguese then withdrew from the island, which was taken effortlessly by the Spaniards. Cevallos then left a garrison on the island and sailed south, reaching Colonia del Sacramento on May 22. The Portuguese fleet, however, still patrolled the coast from time to time. On 20 April 1778, the Santo António, together with the ship of the line Prazeres, seized the Spanish ships San Agustín and Sant'Anna after fierce combat off the coast of Santa Catarina, taking 750 prisoners.

In Europe

Bombardment of Algiers

In the 18th century, Barbary Corsairs – especially Algerians – began raiding ships in the Mediterranean and on the western coast of the Iberian Peninsula. The peace treaty that Charles III of Spain celebrated with the Ottoman Empire did not stop corsair attacks on Spanish ships. As a result, a Spanish fleet, under the command of Antonio Barceló, carried out the bombardment of Algiers in 1783, which did little to stop the corsairs. It was then agreed that a new fleet, consisting of Spanish, Portuguese, Neapolitan and Maltese ships attacked Algiers. The small Portuguese fleet that joined these naval forces consisted of the ships of the line Santo António and Nossa Senhora do Bom Sucesso and the frigates Golfinho and Tritão. The Portuguese fleet joined the rest of the allied fleet in Algiers on 12 July 1784 and began attacking it that same day.

Final years in the Portuguese navy

On 1 April 1794, back in Lisbon, the ship underwent general repairs and modernization. Completely repaired by June 14, it was renamed D. Pedro Carlos in honor of the
Spanish prince Pedro Carlos of Spain and Portugal, nephew of Portuguese prince John, future consort of Maria Teresa of Braganza, the Princess of Beira, and General Admiral of the Royal Portuguese Navy.

After a series of trips from Europe to Brazil in the following years, D. Pedro Carlos once again underwent repairs in 1806, being renamed Martim de Freitas. With the Napoleonic Wars raging in Europe and the subsequent French invasion of Portugal, the Portuguese royal family decided to flee to Brazil bringing with it its court. D. Pedro Carlos was part of the fleet that brought the royal family to Brazil, departing from Lisbon on 29 November 1807 and reaching Rio de Janeiro in March 1808. Upon arriving in Rio de Janeiro, the Portuguese ships, including D. Pedro Carlos, fell into disrepair and were left anchored in Rio de Janeiro.

In the Imperial Brazilian navy

Brazilian War of Independence

After the return of king John VI to Portugal as a result of the Revolution of Porto, a letter of 26 October 1821 ordered the Prince Regent Pedro, his son, to make all the ships stationed in Brazil ready to return to Lisbon, these included the ships of the line Vasco da Gama, Martim de Freitas and Afonso de Albuquerque. Perhaps the Portuguese cortes, already fearing independentist movements in Brazil, wanted to secure control of the ships.

The Martim de Freitas was undergoing repairs in Rio de Janeiro. On 7 September 1822, prince Pedro proclaimed Brazil's independence from Portugal in the event that became known as the Grito do Ipiranga, the Cry of Ipiranga. Hostilities between Brazilians and Portuguese were already happening all over Brazil, however. Pedro quickly set out to create a naval force capable of facing off the Portuguese ships in Brazil and the ones that could eventually be sent from Europe in order to keep the territorial integrity of the empire. The Martim de Freitas, whose repairs were almost finished, was rearmed and incorporated into the newly formed Imperial Brazilian Navy, being renamed Pedro I in honor of Brazil's first emperor. On 10 November 1822 it hoisted the flag of the Empire of Brazil for the first time, which was accompanied by a cannon salvo.

Pedro I was chosen by British admiral Thomas Cochrane to be the flagship of the Imperial Brazilian Navy. Cochrane had recently arrived in Brazil after fighting the Spaniards in the Chilean War of Independence, being hired by the Brazilian government to command the Brazilian navy in the war against Portugal. Cochrane hoisted his flag on Pedro I on 21 March 1823, having remarked:

On 3 April 1823, Pedro I departed from Guanabara Bay. Its commander was frigate captain Thomaz Sackville Crosbie. Crosbie's staff included admiral Cochrane, secretary and first lieutenant Victor Santiago Subrá, captain lieutenant John Pascoe Grenfell, first lieutenant William Eyre, second lieutenant William Parker, midshipman Pedro Paulo Boutrolle, commissar José Cristóvão Salgado, chaplain Marista Augusto de Santa Rita and scrivener Manoel Fernandes Pinto. Soon after, however, Cochrane wrote to José Bonifácio de Andrada detailing the poor condition of the ships, remarking that Pedro I was the only ship that could attack an enemy warship or operate against superior enemy forces despite also being in poor condition.

Pedro I sailed for Bahia in order to blockade the Portuguese forces stationed there. On 4 May 1823 it fought against a larger Portuguese fleet, damaging it, but with no victory for either side, as the Portuguese powder monkeys refused to provide ammunition for the guns at the height of the battle. On that battle the Pedro I suffered 17 casualties between killed and wounded. On May 5 it entered the Morro de São Paulo. There the 18-pounder guns on the deck were changed for the 24-pounder guns of the Ipiranga frigate, which were lighter. The 32-pounder carronades of the Ipiranga were also mounted on Pedro I'''s orlop, increasing its total guns. The ship's crew was complemented to a total of 900 men, gathered from the rest of the squadron. After the changes, Pedro I had one 32-pounder battery and two 24-pounder batteries.

On June 12, accompanied by two more ships, Pedro I entered the port of Bahia and tried to attack the Portuguese fleet that was anchored there. The lack of wind and
the low tide frustrated Cochrane's attack. On July 2, it left with the other ships of the fleet in pursuit of the Portuguese way up the Equator line, managing to capture many enemy ships, however, admiral Cochrane decided to return on July 17 to subdue the northern parts of Brazil that were still under Portuguese control. On July 26, Pedro I arrived in São Luís, capital of the captaincy of Maranhão, which was still occupied by the Portuguese. After entering the port, a feat never hitherto carried out by a ship of that type, and making an elevation shot over the city in such a way that terrified the Portuguese occupiers, Cochrane told the Portuguese his ship was the spearhead of a large Brazilian fleet, the strategy worked and the Portuguese surrendered the town on July 31. It was immediately incorporated into the empire. For this service Cochrane was awarded the noble title of Marquis of Maranhão.

Confederation of the Equator

On 2 August 1824, Pedro I left for Pernambuco, where the Confederation of the Equator had been proclaimed, flying lord Cochrane's pavilion and carrying troops from the
army that landed in the port of Jaraguá in Maceió. At the beginning of October it sailed north until it reached Ceará, from where it returned to Recife. From there the ship sailed to Salvador on October 10, docking at the Bay of All Saints on October 24. It then returned to the north, docking for a while in Maranhão. There, after requesting his payment, paying a portion that was his debt and satisfying the officers and crew, admiral Cochrane transferred his pavilion to the frigate Piranga, and sailed back to England. There, he asked to be dismissed from service in the Brazilian navy.

Cisplatine War

On 24 November 1826 emperor Pedro I embarked on Pedro I and sailed south in order to deal with the ongoing Cisplatine War between the Empire of Brazil and the United Provinces of the Río de la Plata over control of the Brazilian Cisplatina province. On that occasion Pedro I was commanded by chief of division Diogo Jorge de Brito and the squadron was commanded by admiral Manuel Antônio Farinha, the Count of Sousel. During the trip south, the Argentine corsair frigate Chacabuco appeared in its course, but was pursued and some shots were fired at it. Pedro I was heavier and the Argentine frigate managed to escape. Pedro I reached Santa Catarina, from where the emperor went by land to Rio Grande do Sul. However, he didn't reach his destination, having soon changed his course back to Rio de Janeiro, due to the death of his wife, empress Maria Leopoldina of Austria, on 11 December 1826. On 4 January 1827 the ship sailed back to Rio de Janeiro carrying the emperor on board, reaching its destination on January 15.

As if it were immediately a matter of properly equipping it for war, deputy Bernardo Pereira de Vasconcelos, in August 1827, expressed his thoughts regarding Pedro I in the tribune of the General Assembly:

Final years
By 1832 Pedro I'' was serving only as a prison ship as it was already too rotten and incapable of navigating. By that time its crew numbered only 186 men. Some of its parts were removed to be sold. By the second half of 1833 it was still serving as a prison ship, being scrapped in Rio de Janeiro.

References

Citations

Bibliography

External links
 Brazilian warships - Pedro I ship of the line, former Martim de Freitas

1763 ships
Ships of the line of the Portuguese Navy
Ships of the line of the Brazilian Navy
Ships built in Brazil